José Ángel Trelles (born José Ángel Amato; 28 August 1944 – 10 December 2022) was an Argentine singer, composer, and stage actor.

Life and career 
Born in Buenos Aires, Trelles became first known in the 1970s thanks to his participation in the musical TV-show Siete y medio and later winning the musical competition held in the TV-show Canciorena, which got him a contract with the record label RCA. During his career he recorded about two dozen albums and collaborated as a singer and a composer with important artists such as Sandro de América, Victor Heredia, Estela Raval, Rubén Juárez, Alberto Cortez, Raúl Lavié. His most important collaboration was with Astor Piazzolla, with whom he toured nationally and abroad as a member of his ensemble Octeto Electrónico, even performing at the Carnegie Hall.   

As a stage actor, Trelles got his first success starring in the 1979 musical ; he later played leading roles in numerous stage works, notably co-starring alongside Milva in a successful rendition of the Piazzolla-penned operetta María de Buenos Aires. In 2018 he released a collection of short stories, El Bar de Los Milagros. 

Trelles died on 10 December 2022, at the age of 78.

References

External links 

  
 
 

1944 births
2022 deaths 
Singers from Buenos Aires
Argentine male singers
Argentine stage actors
Argentine tango musicians
Argentine composers